Karkir Taye (born 13 December 1995) is an Indian cricketer. He made his List A debut on 2 October 2019, for Arunachal Pradesh in the 2019–20 Vijay Hazare Trophy. He made his Twenty20 debut on 15 November 2019, for Arunachal Pradesh in the 2019–20 Syed Mushtaq Ali Trophy. He made his first-class debut on 9 December 2019, for Arunachal Pradesh in the 2019–20 Ranji Trophy.

References

External links
 

1995 births
Living people
Indian cricketers
Arunachal Pradesh cricketers
Place of birth missing (living people)